Rony Sefo (born 10 April 1972 in New Zealand) is a former two-time World Champion New Zealand kickboxer and mixed martial artist, who fought on Pride Fighting Championships and K-1. 
As a kickboxer he holds notable wins against Hiriwa Te Rangi and Ricardo Van Den Bos. He is the younger brother of the Muay Thai World champion Ray Sefo. Sefo is married to Kara, and they have two children.

Championships and accomplishments

Kickboxing
1996 UTC World Heavyweight Champion 
1998 ISKA World Heavyweight Champion
K-1
 K-1 Oceania 2000 (3rd)
 K-1 New Zealand Grand Prix 2000 Finalist
 K-1 New Zealand Grand Prix 2001 Finalist
 K-1 Oceania 2001 (5th)

Records

Kickboxing record

Mixed martial arts record

|-
| Loss
| align=center| 0–2
| Sam Brown
| Decision (unanimous)
| XMMA 2 - ANZ vs. USA
| 
| align=center| 3
| align=center| 5:00
| Sydney, Australia
| 
|-
| Loss
| align=center| 0–1
| Kiyoshi Tamura
| Submission (armbar)
| Pride Shockwave 2003
| 
| align=center| 1
| align=center| 2:20
| Saitama, Japan
|

References

External links
 

New Zealand male mixed martial artists
New Zealand male kickboxers
Living people
1972 births
Sportspeople from Auckland